Ambohitsitondrona is a genus of leaf beetles in the subfamily Eumolpinae. It was described by the Czech entomologist Jan Bechyné in 1964. It contains three species, all of which are found in Madagascar. It is related to the genus Sahantaha.

Species
The genus Ambohitsitondrona includes three species:
 Ambohitsitondrona micheli Bechyné, 1964 – type locality: Ambohitsitondrona
 Ambohitsitondrona paradoxa Bechyné, 1964 – type locality: Andrangoloaka, 1600 m, O. S. O. de Tananarive
 Ambohitsitondrona tenuepunctata Bechyné, 1964 – type locality: Ankarampotsy, Tantamala, 1000–1100 m

References

Eumolpinae
Chrysomelidae genera
Beetles of Africa
Insects of Madagascar
Endemic fauna of Madagascar